Jaber Issa Mohammed Mustafa (born 7 June 1997) is a Saudi Arabian football player who plays as a midfielder for Al-Jabalain. He represented the Saudi Arabia national football team on one occasion, in a 2017 Gulf Cup of Nations match against Oman.

Club career
On 21 January 2018 Jaber Issa signed his first professional contract with Al-Shabab before immediately being loaned out to Villarreal B. Despite making no appearances for Al-Shabab, Jaber left the club on 9 June 2018 and joined fellow Pro League club Al-Ittihad signing a 2-year deal.

On 7 September 2022, Issa joined Al-Jabalain.

References

1997 births
Saudi Arabian footballers
Living people
Association football midfielders
Al-Shabab FC (Riyadh) players
Villarreal CF B players
Ittihad FC players
Al-Wehda Club (Mecca) players
Al-Raed FC players
FC Van players
Al-Jabalain FC players
Segunda División B players
Saudi Professional League players
Armenian Premier League players
Saudi First Division League players
Saudi Arabia international footballers
Saudi Arabian expatriate footballers
Saudi Arabian expatriate sportspeople in Spain
Saudi Arabian expatriate sportspeople in Armenia
Expatriate footballers in Armenia
Expatriate footballers in Spain
Naturalised citizens of Saudi Arabia